Hessen may refer to:

Hesse, a cultural region of Germany and a German state (land)
an adjective thereof, see Hesse (disambiguation)
Hessen (Osterwieck), also Hessen am Fallstein, a village in the Harz district of Saxony-Anhalt, Germany
Hessen (ship), several naval ships of Germany
Boris Hessen, Soviet physicist